Süleyman Şefik Pasha was the commander of the Kuvâ-i İnzibâtiyye, an army established on 18 April 1920 by the Imperial Government of the Ottoman Empire in order to fight against the Turkish National Movement in the aftermath of World War I.

Biography 

He was born in 1860 in Erzurum to Ali Kemali Pasha, who served as governor of Rumelia (the Balkans), Tripolitania (Libya), Mosul, and Konya. His family was long known as the Söylemezoğulları (descendants of a man nicknamed Söylemez, "won't tell").

The Kuvâ-i İnzibâtiyye was supported by the British so as to enforce British policy in Anatolia and enforce the partitioning and stabilize the remnants of the defeated Ottoman Empire.

He was the grandfather of Turkish musician Şehrazat and the father of Princess Perizat Osmanoğlu and Siham Kemali Söylemezoğlu, the first mining magnate in Turkey. After the Surname Law of 1934, his family adopted their family name as their official surname, Söylemezoğlu. The Kuvâ-i İnzibâtiyye was supported by the British so as to enforce British policy in Anatolia and enforce the partitioning and stabilize the remnants of the defeated Ottoman Empire. It was led by him.

He died in 1946 in İstanbul.

Pashas
Ottoman Army personnel
1860 births
1946 deaths